Santa Rita is a district of the Nandayure canton, in the Guanacaste province of Costa Rica.

Geography 
Santa Rita has an area of  km² and an elevation of  metres.

Villages
Administrative center of the district is the village of Santa Rita.

Other villages in the district are Angostura, Cacao, Chumico, Guaria, Guastomatal, Morote, Tacanis, Uvita (partly), Hierbabuena (partly).

Demographics 

For the 2011 census, Santa Rita had a population of  inhabitants.

Transportation

Road transportation 
The district is covered by the following road routes:
 National Route 21
 National Route 161

References 

Districts of Guanacaste Province
Populated places in Guanacaste Province